The National Day of Singapore is celebrated every year on 9 August, in commemoration of Singapore's independence from Malaysia in 1965. This holiday features the National Day Parade (NDP), National Day Message by the Prime Minister of Singapore, fireworks celebrations, and even advertisements urging Singaporean residents to procreate.

1960-1962 

Between 1960-62, Singapore celebrated National Day on 3 June to mark self-government and the end of colonial rule by the United Kingdom.

National Day Parade

The Singapore National Day Parade is a national ceremony that is usually held at The Float @ Marina Bay, the National Stadium at the Singapore Sports Hub, or the Padang. In 2007, the Parade was held at The Float @ Marina Bay for the first time, and in 2016, it was held at the Singapore Sports Hub. The parade includes performances that depict the yearly theme.

National Day Message

The National Day Message is an annual tradition since 1966. In each year's recorded message, the Prime Minister of Singapore "examine[s] domestic and global developments, review[s] economic performance and outlook, and outline[s] national priorities and government plans as [he inspires] Singaporeans to move forward with a unified sense of purpose".

Singapore Fireworks Celebrations

National Day celebrations also include fireworks celebrations. They feature several local and foreign teams which launch fireworks displays on different nights. First held in 2004 at Marina Bay, the event was initially known as the Singapore Fireworks Festival and organised by Unusual Productions. The amount of fireworks used has grown in magnitude over the past three years, from 4,000 rounds used in 2004 to over 9,000 in 2006. In 2012, a Mentos commercial encouraged procreation during the same time as the fireworks celebration.

See also
List of Singaporean patriotic songs

References

Annual events in Singapore
Singapore
August observances
Public holidays in Singapore
Independence days